Weisser is a surname of German origin. Notable people with the surname include:

Morgan Weisser (born 1971), American actor
Norbert Weisser (born 1946), German-born American actor
Katja Schweizer (nee Weisser) (born 1978), German curler and coach

References

German-language surnames